Jalan Raja Laut is a major road in Kuala Lumpur, Malaysia. It was named after the Penghulu (chief or governor) of Kuala Lumpur, Raja Laut.

It is a one-way road, northward only, from Jalan Raja to Jalan Sultan Ismail. It is parallel to Jalan Tunku Abdul Rahman, another one-way road albeit southward only.

Landmarks
Dewan Bandaraya Kuala Lumpur
Menara EON Bank (also known as Menara Raja Laut)
SOGO Department Store
EPF headquarters
MARA Building
FELDA Global Ventures building
  and  LRT stations
The Plaza Hotel

List of junctions

References

Roads in Kuala Lumpur